Roukaya Moussa Mahamane (born 13 January 1997 in Niamey) is a Nigerien swimmer. She competed in the women's 50 metre freestyle event at the 2016 Summer Olympics, where she ranked 83rd with a time of 36.50 seconds, a national record. She did not advance to the semifinals.

In 2019, she represented Niger at the World Aquatics Championships held in Gwangju, South Korea. She competed in the women's 50 metre freestyle and women's 100 metre freestyle events. In both events she did not advance to compete in the semi-finals.

She competed in the women's 50 metre freestyle event at the 2020 Summer Olympics.

She represented Niger at the 2022 World Aquatics Championships held in Budapest, Hungary. She competed in the women's 50 metre freestyle and women's 100 metre freestyle events.

References

1997 births
Living people
Nigerien female swimmers
Olympic swimmers of Niger
Swimmers at the 2016 Summer Olympics
Nigerien female freestyle swimmers
Swimmers at the 2019 African Games
African Games competitors for Niger
Swimmers at the 2020 Summer Olympics

People from Niamey